Bala Nagamma is a 1959 Indian Telugu-language fantasy swashbuckler film directed by Vedantam Raghavayya. The film stars N. T. Rama Rao, Anjali Devi, and S. V. Ranga Rao with music composed by T. V. Raju. It is a remake of the 1942 Telugu film of the same name.

Plot 
Queen Bhoolakshmi (Hemalatha) prays to Lord Siva for children and acquires a boon. The Lord orders her to take a fruit from the tree in the front of the temple. To reach, she steps on a snake anthill when King Nagendra inside becomes furious, and tries to bite her but she requests him to leave until she becomes a mother and he agrees. Bhoolakshmi is blessed with 7 beautiful daughters named Suryanagamma, Chandranagamma, Dakshinakanya, Munikanya, Pagadala Sangamma, Utharakanya, and Bala Nagamma and dies.

After her death, King Navabhoja Raju (C. S. R.) remarries Manikyala Devi (Suryakala) to take care of the children, but the shrew woman harasses the kids and also goads the king to leave the girls in the forest. Bhoolakshmi's aura saves them and they grow up. As years go by, Bhoolakshmi's brother King Ramavardhi (A. V. Subba Rao) sends his seven sons in search of his niece. In the forest, the younger prince Karyavardhi (N. T. Rama Rao) spots the last girl Bala Nagamma (Anjali Devi) and both of them fall in love.

Now the seven sisters marry the seven princes and Karyavardhi and Balanagamma are blessed with a baby boy. Meanwhile, the wicked wizard Mayala Marathi (S. V. Ranga Rao) challenges his paramour Rani Sangu (Raja Sulochana) to show a beautiful woman in the universe and kidnaps Bala Nagamma from her palace. After that, he turns Karyavardhi and his army who confronts him, into statues. Here Bala Nagamma tries to commit suicide when Bhoolakshmi's aura again protects her and explains that her son at the age of 12 will rescue her.

In the present, Bala Nagamma plots and resists Marathi in the name of the vow (vratha) for 12-year to which Marathi agrees. Time passes, and Bala Nagamma's son Balavardhi (Mater Satyanarayana) learns that his parents have been held captive by Mayala Marathi. Thereupon, Balavardhi starts, enters the Marathi's den, meets his mother, and breakouts the life secret Marathi. Soon, he sets off on an adventurous journey that takes him across the seven seas to bring the parrot which lies in the Marathi's life. Finally, he eliminates Marathi, frees his parents and returns home to be appointed as the Prince.

Cast 
N. T. Rama Rao as Karyavardhi
Anjali Devi as Bala Nagamma
S. V. Ranga Rao as Mayala Marathi
Relangi as Thalari Ramudu
C. S. R. as Navabhoja Raju
Chadalavada as Tippadu
A. V. Subba Rao as Ramavardhi
Lanka Satyam as Puliraju
Raja Sulochana as Sangu
Hemalatha as Bhulakshmi Devi
Suryakala as Manikyala Devi
Master Satyanarayana as Balavardhi

Production 
Bala Nagamma was remade from the 1942 film of the same name. Relangi and Lanka Satyam, who appeared in the 1942 film, returned in the remake.

Soundtrack 

Telugu Songs
The soundtrack of the film was composed by T. V. Raju, while the lyrics were written by Samudrala Jr.

Playback singers are Ghantasala, Pithapuram Nageswara Rao, P. Leela, Jikki, P. Susheela, S. Janaki and K. Rani.

Tamil Songs
Music by Pamarthi. Lyrics by Kuyilan and Kambadasan. Playback singers are Seerkazhi Govindarajan, Ghantasala, P. Seenivasan, A. L. Raghavan, P. Leela, P. Susheela, Jikki, R. Balasaraswathi Devi and K. Rani.

Reception 
The Indian Express in its review dated 11 March 1960 reviewing the Tamil-dubbed version noted the theme "will not be without fascination for our Tamil folk on account of the touch of the super-natural dominating the theme" but praised S. V. Ranga Rao as "providing major attraction".

References

External links 
 

1950s fantasy adventure films
1950s Telugu-language films
Films directed by Vedantam Raghavayya
Indian fantasy adventure films
Indian swashbuckler films
Remakes of Indian films